The Revista Brasileira de Química was a scientific journal of chemistry published from 1936–1978. The journal is also called Revista Brasileira de Química: Ciencia e Indústria. The publisher was the Revista Brasileira de Química itself in São Paulo, publication ceased in 1978.

See also 
 Anais da ABQ
 Eclética Química
 Journal of the Brazilian Chemical Society
 Revista Brasileira de Engenharia Química, Caderno de Engenharia Química
 Revista Brasileira de Chímica 
 Southern Brazilian Journal of Chemistry
 Química Nova

References

Chemistry journals
Defunct journals